During the 40th century BC, the Eastern Mediterranean region was in the Chalcolithic period (Copper Age), transitional between the Stone and the Bronze Ages. Northwestern Europe was in the Neolithic. China was dominated by the Neolithic Yangshao culture. The Americas were in a phase of transition between the Paleo-Indian (Lithic) to the Meso-Indian (Archaic) stage. This century started in 4000 BC and ended in 3901 BC.

Cultures

Near East
In Predynastic Egypt, the El Omari culture arose during this period
Start of the Naqada culture in Egypt
In Mesopotamia, the Uruk period began

Europe

The Linear Pottery culture gives way to the Funnelbeaker culture in the north
Cucuteni–Trypillian culture
Pit–Comb Ware culture
In the Pontic steppe, the Dnieper–Donets and Sredny Stog cultures flourish, according to the Kurgan hypothesis associated with Proto-Indo-Europeans

East Asia
Liangzhu culture
Early Jōmon period begins on the islands of Japan

Events and innovations

5.9-kiloyear event
c. 4000 BC, more than 100 dwellings surrounding a community center, a cemetery and a kiln are built in Jiangzhai, near modern Xi'an, China
Susa is a center of pottery production; c. potter's wheel in Mesopotamia
Approximate time of the construction of the Merheleva Ridge complex
Megalithic monuments are constructed in Brittany (Carnac), Portugal (Lisbon), central and southern France, Corsica and Great Britain
Metallurgy during the Copper Age in Europe
Domestication of the horse
Plough in use
Clay pots and vats discovered at a sprawling cave system in southern Armenia near the border with Iran shows signs of an organized effort to press and distill grapes

Calendars
Bede began his history of the world with 3952 BC
In their ceremonial or commemorative proceedings, Freemasons add 4,000 years to the current Anno Domini calendar year and append Anno Lucis ("Year of Light") to the year (i.e., 2020 AD = 6020 AL). This alternative calendar era, which would designate 4000 BC as "year zero", was created in the 18th century (58th century AL) in deference to the Hebrew calendar's Anno mundi and other ideas regarding the year of creation at the time.

References

-0
-60